William Augustus may refer to:

 Prince William, Duke of Cumberland (1721–1765)
 William Augustus (translator), 18th-century weather forecaster and translator
 William Augustus, Duke of Brunswick-Harburg (1564–1642)